Blithe may refer to:

Albert Blithe (1923–1967), American sergeant in World War II
John Blithe (MP) (before 1365 – 1410), English politician
John Blithe (priest) (before 1450 – after 1478), English Archdeacon of Stow and Lindsey 1477–78
River Blithe, Staffordshire, England

See also
Blythe (disambiguation)
Blyth (disambiguation)